Karl Puusemp (21 October 1903 Tähtvere Parish, Tartu County – 18 June 1978 Türi) was an Estonian politician. He was a member of VI Riigikogu (its Chamber of Deputies).

References

1903 births
1978 deaths
Members of the Estonian National Assembly
People from Tartu County
Members of the Riigivolikogu